Aravinda Bandara (born 1 April 1995) is a Sri Lankan cricketer. He made his List A debut on 14 December 2019, for Saracens Sports Club in the 2019–20 Invitation Limited Over Tournament.

References

External links
 

1995 births
Living people
Sri Lankan cricketers
Saracens Sports Club cricketers
Place of birth missing (living people)